The 2005–06 Top League was the third season of Japan's domestic rugby union competition, the Top League.

Toshiba Brave Lupus won both the league round-robin and the Microsoft Cup knockout competitions.

Teams

Top League season

Final standings

Fixtures and results

Microsoft Cup play-offs
The top eight teams in the league played off for the Microsoft Cup (2006) knock out tournament, which was won by Toshiba Brave Lupus.

Quarter-finals

Semi-finals

Final

Top League Challenge Series

Coca-Cola West Red Sparks and IBM Big Blue won promotion to the 2006–07 Top League via the 2006 Top League Challenge Series, while Honda Heat, Kintetsu Liners, Kyuden Voltex and NTT Communications Shining Arcs progressed to the promotion play-offs.

Promotion and relegation play-offs
Four promotion/relegation matches (Irekaesen) were played with the winner of each qualifying for the 2006–07 Top League. The 9th, 10th, and 11th placed team from the Top League played against the 3rd, 2nd, and 1st placed teams, respectively, from Challenge 2. The 12th placed team from the Top League played against the 3rd placed team from Challenge 1. 

So Fukuoka, Ricoh, Secom, and World all remained in the Top League for 2006–07.

References

Japan top league
2005–06 in Japanese rugby union
2005-06